Kamyk  is a village in the administrative district of Gmina Kłobuck, within Kłobuck County, Silesian Voivodeship, in southern Poland.

The village has a population of 1,245.

References

External links 
 Jewish Community in Kamyk on Virtual Shtetl

Kamyk